Santa Maria Addolorata, also called the Chiesa dei Servi  is a Renaissance style, Roman Catholic church located on Via Gennari in Cento, Province of Ferrara, region of Emilia-Romagna, Italy.

History
Construction of the church began in  commissioned by the Servite order of Ferrara. They remained attached to the church until 1652. For many years, the church was maintained by the Compagnia detta “ del Sacco “ instituted in 1641 by the Capuchin monk Giovanni da Sestola.

Five of the altars are decorated with major paintings by Guercino, Cesare Gennari, and other Baroque era artists. Guercino also painted a  "Sudarium carried by Angels. portato dagli angeli". Denys Calvaert painted the Archangel Michael. Lorenzo Gennari painted a St Francis receives Stigmata''. One of the chapels now has a copy of  Guercino's "St Carlo Borromeo in prayer".

Due to the 2012 Northern Italy earthquakes, the church is closed for restoration.

References

Roman Catholic churches in Cento
Renaissance architecture in Emilia-Romagna
16th-century Roman Catholic church buildings in Italy